Soundtrack to Your Life can refer to:
 Soundtrack to Your Life (album), 2006 album by Ashley Parker Angel
 Soundtrack to Your Life (song), 2006 single by Ashley Parker Angel